Gerardo Herrero Pérez-Gamir (born 28 January 1953) is a Spanish film director, screenwriter and producer. He is a prolific promoter of international coproductions and collaborations between Spain and Hispanic American countries.

From 1993 to 1994, he chaired the Academy of Cinematographic Arts and Sciences of Spain.

His 1997 film Comanche Territory was entered into the 47th Berlin International Film Festival.

Herrero founded Tornasol Films together with Javier López Blanco in 1987. He has often co-produced in tandem with Uruguayan producer Mariela Besuievsky, with whom he has also shared a domestic partnership.

Filmography as film director

1994: Desvío al paraíso
1995: Malena es un nombre de tango (Malena Is a Name from a Tango)
1997: Territorio Comanche (Comanche Territory)
1998: Frontera Sur
1999: América mía
2000: Las razones de mis amigos
2001: El lugar donde estuvo el paraiso
2003: El misterio Galíndez (The Galíndez File)
2004: El principio de Arquímedes (The Archimedes Principle)
2004: Ni locas, ni terroristas
2005: Heroína (Heroine)
2006: Los aires difíciles (Rough Winds)
2007: Una mujer invisible
2008: Que parezca un accidente
2009: Night Runner
2011: Silencio en la nieve (Frozen Silence)
2013: Lejos del mundo
2013: Crimen con vista al mar
2015: La playa de los ahogados

Filmography as film producer

1988: La boca del lobo. by Francisco J. Lombardi
1990: Caídos del cielo. by Francisco J. Lombardi
1992: Un paraguas para tres. by Felipe Vega
1993: Le journal de Lady M. by Alain Tanner
1994: Desvío al paraíso. by Gerardo Herrero
1995: Guantanamera. by Tomás Gutiérrez Alea
1995: Malena es un nombre de tango. by Gerardo Herrero
1996: Éxtasis. by Mariano Barroso
1996: Bajo la piel. by Francisco J. Lombardi
1997: Cosas que dejé en La Habana. by Manuel Gutiérrez Aragón
1997: Martín (Hache). by Adolfo Aristarain
1997: Mensaka. by Salvador García Ruiz
1998: El Pianista. by Mario Gas
1999: El corazón del guerrero. by Daniel Monzón
2000: Nueces para el amor. by Alberto Lecchi
2000: El otro barrio. by Salvador García Ruiz
2000: Lista de Espera. by Juan Carlos Tabío
2000: Las razones de mis amigos. by Gerardo Herrero
2000: Sé quién eres. by Patricia Ferreira
2000: Krámpack. by Cesc Gay
2000: Tinta roja. by Francisco J. Lombardi
2000: Kasbah. by Mariano Barroso
2000: Le harem de Mme Osmane by De Nadir Moknèche.
2001: El hijo de la novia. by Juan José Campanella
2001: Sin vergüenza. by Joaquín Oristrell
2001: Hombres felices. by Roberto Santiago
2001: L’amore imperfetto. by Giovanni Davide Maderna
2002: Lugares comunes. by Adolfo Aristarain
2002: El último tren. Corazón de fuego. by Diego Arsuaga
2002: Rosa la china. by Valeria Sarmiento
2002: Aunque estés lejos. by Juan Carlos Tabio
2003: La vida mancha. by Enrique Urbizu
2003: El misterio Galíndez/The Galindez File. by Gerardo Herrero
2003: En la ciudad. by Cesc Gay
2004: Luna de Avellaneda. by Juan José Campanella
2004: La vida que te espera. by Manuel Gutiérrez Aragón
2004: Nubes de verano. by Felipe Vega
2004: Machuca. by Andrés Wood
2004: Seres queridos. by Dominic Harari
2004: Inconscientes. by Joaquín Oristrell
2004: Perder es cuestión de método. by Sergio Cabrera
2005: El penalti más largo del mundo. by Roberto Santiago
2005: Hormigas en la boca. by Mariano Barroso
2005: Heroína. by Gerardo Herrero
2005: Los aires difíciles. by Gerardo Herrero
2009: Castillos de papel. by Salvador García Ruiz
2009: El secreto de sus ojos. by Juan José Campanella
2012: Todos tenemos un plan by Ana Piterbarg
2016: Que Dios nos perdone by Rodrigo Sorogoyen
2018: The Man Who Killed Don Quixote. by Terry Gilliam
2021: El sustituto by Oscar Aibar

References

External links

Coproducciones, por Gerardo Herrero, 2001, Instituto Cervantes
Filmografía completa, en Culturalia.
The New York Times

1953 births
Living people
20th-century Spanish male writers
20th-century Spanish screenwriters
21st-century Spanish male writers
21st-century Spanish screenwriters
Film directors from Madrid
Film producers from Madrid
Spanish film producers
Spanish male screenwriters
Writers from Madrid